"Something in My House" is a song by English pop band Dead or Alive, produced by Stock Aitken Waterman. It was released in the UK in December 1986 as the second single from the band's third studio album, Mad, Bad and Dangerous to Know. The single peaked at No. 12 on the UK singles chart.

Background
Originally conceived by singer Pete Burns as a Halloween release, the horror-themed "Something in My House" was delayed until late December in the UK, amid wrangling between the band and their record company, with the latter feeling the track was "too brutal" to be a single. 

Clashes between the band and the label continued over the song's music video, with Epic Records reportedly objecting to a "mildly suggestive" sequence involving Burns and a banana.

"By the time we got to 'Something in My House', I felt I wanted to express myself on film, as well as record, amuse myself, show my sense of humour," Burns wrote on the liner notes to his Evolution: The Videos compilation DVD. "Well apparently the manner in which I 'peeled a banana' seemed to work against me/us! And, it was downhill all the way after that."

Recording of the song was also fraught, with Burns alleging that producer Mike Stock erased his original vocal take after objecting to the singer's use of the phrase "wicked queen"; a lyrical double entendre implying reference to a gay relationship.

"We would butt heads so fucking badly; it was unbelievable," Burns told journalist James Arena in his book Europe's Stars of 80s Dance Pop. "That's why we eventually walked away from them. For instance, there was a lyric from 'Something in My House' where I make reference to a wicked queen. 

"The actual producer, Mike Stock stopped me and said I couldn't use that term because it would mean the record is about gay people. I was like, 'Fuck this, it's going on!' They actually wiped the original vocal, but then Pete Waterman came back and said, 'Let him do it the way he wants to.'"

Despite the reservations of the label and producers, the track proved to be Dead or Alive's biggest hit in the UK since "Lover Come Back to Me" and was the only single from their third album to earn a UK top 20 placement. The song also proved to be the act's final top 40 hit with an original release in the UK, and their last top 20 hit in Australia.

A 12" white label mix, known as "Naughty XXX", was released to club DJs, featuring a series of dialogue clips from horror film The Exorcist (1973) - with the track described as "unique" in its capacity as the only example of a "filthy, obscene [and] sexually explicit" Stock Aitken Waterman record.

Track listing

Chart performance

References

External links

1986 singles
1986 songs
Dead or Alive (band) songs
Song recordings produced by Stock Aitken Waterman
Songs written by Pete Burns
Songs written by Tim Lever
Songs written by Mike Percy (musician)
Epic Records singles
Hi-NRG songs